Rex v. Scofield, Cald. 397 (1784), is a British criminal law case that made attempt part of the common law, emphasizing the intent of an actor over the incomplete criminal act. Scofield lit a candle and placed it into flammable material in a house with the intent to burn it down, but the larger fire never happened. Finding crime in the incomplete but intended act of arson, Lord Mansfield held that "completion of an act, criminal in itself, [was not] necessary to constitute criminality", and "The intent may make an act, innocent in itself, criminal..."

References

1784 in British law
English law articles needing infoboxes